Freeze Out is the 2005 debut feature film of M.J. Loheed an American writer and director. It was financed primarily with Loheed’s own poker winnings and is believed to be the first independent film financed with poker money.

It premiered in 2005 at the Westwood International Film Festival where it won the Best Feature Award. Freeze Out was also an official selection of the 2006 Cinequest Viewer's Voice Festival and the 2006 Omaha film Festival.

Synopsis
Freeze Out is a comedy about one man's ridiculous and overzealous attempt to get revenge for the constant ribbing of his best friends at his weekly poker game. John's weekly poker game is a sanctuary from the horrors of living and working in Los Angeles: a ritual of jokes, beer drinking, talking movies, politics, and sex. In short, it's a good time and the max bet is 25 cents so no one is going to go broke. But something is bugging John. His friends don't respect him; any chance they get they cut him down, tell him he's boring, make him feel small. He's tired of being the butt of their jokes and he's not going to take it anymore. So he raises the stakes, trains in secret and engineers a winner-take-all Freeze Out, never realizing it might cost him his 7 best friends. What starts as an innocent night of low stakes poker becomes a ripping lampoon of friendship and a funny look at how we all lie to ourselves.

References

External links
 Freeze Out Official Site
 

2005 films
2005 comedy-drama films
American comedy-drama films
Films about poker
2000s English-language films
2000s American films